William Duffy, Bill Duffy or Billy Duffy may refer to:
 Bill Duffy (basketball), American basketball player and player agent
 Bill Duffy (sportsman) (1866–1959), Australian sportsman
 Billy Duffy (born 1961), English musician
 Billy Duffy (hurler) (1931–2005), Irish hurler
 William Duffy, a pseudonym of William Dufris (born 1958), an American voice actor
 William Duffy (bishop), English Roman Catholic bishop
 William Duffy (politician) (1865–1945), Irish nationalist politician
 William James Duffy (1888–1946), Canadian politician
 William J. Duffy (1916–2013), American jurist and legislator